Exodus (also known as EXODUS 1:7) is the eighth and final studio album by American rapper DMX. It was released on May 28, 2021, through Def Jam Recordings. It is DMX's first studio album in nine years since Undisputed (2012), as well as his first posthumous and final studio album released after his death in April that year, and also his first with Def Jam since Grand Champ (2003). "Bath Salts" featuring Jay-Z and Nas was nominated for a Grammy Award for Best Rap Song.

Background 

On April 2, 2021, at approximately 11:00 pm, DMX was rushed to White Plains Hospital, where he was reported to be in critical condition following a heart attack at his home possibly resulting from a drug overdose. The next day, his attorney Murray Richman confirmed Simmons was on life support. That same night, Simmons suffered cerebral hypoxia (oxygen deprivation to his brain) as paramedics attempted to resuscitate him for 30 minutes. Simmons' former manager, Nakia Walker, said he was in a "vegetative state" with "lung and brain failure and no current brain activity". His manager, Steve Rifkind, stated Simmons was comatose and that he was set to undergo tests to determine his brain's functionality and his family would "determine what's best from there".

Work had commenced on Exodus prior to the death of DMX. He recorded Exodus in American rapper Snoop Dogg's studio, in Los Angeles, California. Swizz Beatz is the executive producer of the album. During the recording of the album, DMX would only record in the daytime, according to Swizz Beatz.

Musicians Bono, Griselda, and Lil Wayne, as well as DMX's daughter, Sonovah appear on the album. Late rapper Pop Smoke was set to appear on the album, but his verse ended up being used in a different song. Following DMX's death, his Instagram account released a post with the caption "5/28 The Legacy continues....#ExodusAlbum". The album shares its title with DMX's son and its cover was shot by photographer Jonathan Mannion. Its track listing was revealed on May 14, 2021, by Swizz Beatz on Instagram.

Release 
On April 9, 2021, the day of DMX's death, the song "X Moves" was released. On April 16, the song "Been to War" by DMX along with Swizz Beatz and French Montana was released as part of the soundtrack for the television series Godfather of Harlem. On May 25, the album's first official single, "Hood Blues" was released, which contains features from New York rappers Westside Gunn, Benny the Butcher, and Conway the Machine, credited as Griselda. Exodus was released on May 28, 2021.

Critical reception 

Exodus received generally positive reviews from critics. At Metacritic, which assigns a normalized score out of 100 to ratings from publications, the album received a mean score of 71 based on 11 reviews, indicating "generally favorable reviews".

Alexis Petridis gave Exodus a positive review, remarking that the album "feels far more like a bold restatement of core values than an attempt to follow trends". However, he criticized certain parts of the album for being "strangely bleak". Will Lavin of NME gave the album another positive review, calling it "a wonderful tribute record loaded with stellar individual moments", although he criticized the album for being "a little unfinished at times". Robin Murray of Clash praised the album, calling it "an unbearably poignant listen at times, with meditations on loss and allegories for death at every corner".

Jeff Ihaza of Rolling Stone gave Exodus a mixed response. He gave positive remarks on DMX's rapping and the production by Swizz Beatz, calling the latter the "most dynamic...of his career". On the contrary, he noted that the album "can't escape the reality it exists in" due to the fact that it was completed before the death of DMX. Providing an example, Ihaza said that it was "hard to listen to a song like 'Bath Salts'—featuring Jay-Z and Nas rapping about being successful billionaires" without feeling a tinge of despair over the death of DMX.

Commercial performance 
Exodus debuted at number eight on the US Billboard 200 with 32,000 album-equivalent units. It marks DMX's eighth top 10 album on the chart. The album received over 22 million on-demand streams in its first week.

Track listing 

Notes
  signifies a co-producer
  signifies an additional producer

Sample credits
 "Take Control" contains a sample from "Sexual Healing" performed by Marvin Gaye.
 "Hood Blues" contains a sample from "Shady Blues" performed by Lee Mason & His Orchestra.
 "That's My Dog" contains a sample from "Serious" performed by Joe Budden and Joell Ortiz.

Charts

References 

2021 albums
Albums published posthumously
Albums produced by AraabMuzik
Albums produced by Jerry Duplessis
Albums produced by Kanye West
Albums produced by Mr. Porter
Albums produced by Swizz Beatz
Def Jam Recordings albums
DMX (rapper) albums